Heidi Bohay (born December 15, 1959) is an American actress and television presenter.

Born in South Bound Brook, New Jersey, Bohay was a 1977 graduate of Bound Brook High School in Bound Brook, New Jersey.

Bohay is best known for her role as Megan Kendall from 1983 to 1987 on the prime-time ABC drama Hotel.

She appeared as a celebrity guest on game shows, including The $25,000 and $100,000 Pyramid, All-Star Blitz, Hollywood Squares, and New Liar's Club. She was the hostess of the cable television shows American Baby and Party at Home. She had co-hosted the interactive TV show GSN Live on GSN from the show's debut on February 25, 2008.

Filmography

References

External links
 

1959 births
Living people
People from South Bound Brook, New Jersey
Actresses from New Jersey
American television actresses
American television personalities
American women television personalities
21st-century American women